Vladimir "Vanja" Grbić (born 14 December 1970) is a Serbian former volleyball player. He is 193 cm and played as passer-side attacker. He is Nikola Grbić's brother and a member of the Volleyball Hall of Fame.

Career
With the national volleyball team of FR Yugoslavia, he won a gold medal in the 2000 Summer Olympics and a bronze medal in 1996 at Atlanta. 

Yugoslav Olympic Committee declared Grbić the best sportsman of the year in 1996 and 2000, and in the 1999 and 2000, he received a Golden Badge, award for best athlete in Yugoslavia.

In December 2010, he briefly considered making a comeback to the sport at the age of 40 due to an offer from Iran. Grbić visited the country in late December but came back dissatisfied saying that terms promised to him were not met and ended up not signing the contract. Vladimir and Nikola's father Miloš Grbić was also into volleyball and was a team member Yugoslavia. Vladimir's wife Sara Grbić-Peković dealt with karate.
Vladimir played in a total of 242 matches for his National Team until his retirement in 2009 at the age of 38. Vladimir Grbić was known for his powerful attacks and precision passing on the volleyball court, but was a true sportsman representing Yugoslavia and then Serbia with the highest of moral standards and his exceptional character.

Clubs

External links

  Player profile at fenerbahce.org

References

1970 births
Living people
Sportspeople from Zrenjanin
Serbian men's volleyball players
Yugoslav men's volleyball players
Olympic volleyball players of Yugoslavia
Olympic volleyball players of Serbia and Montenegro
Olympic gold medalists for Federal Republic of Yugoslavia
Olympic bronze medalists for Federal Republic of Yugoslavia
Volleyball players at the 1996 Summer Olympics
Volleyball players at the 2000 Summer Olympics
Volleyball players at the 2004 Summer Olympics
PAOK V.C. players
Fenerbahçe volleyballers
Olympic medalists in volleyball
European champions for Serbia and Montenegro
Serbia and Montenegro men's volleyball players
Medalists at the 2000 Summer Olympics
Medalists at the 1996 Summer Olympics
Mediterranean Games silver medalists for Yugoslavia
Competitors at the 1991 Mediterranean Games
Serbian expatriate sportspeople in Italy
Expatriate volleyball players in Italy
Serbian expatriate sportspeople in Brazil
Expatriate volleyball players in Brazil
Serbian expatriate sportspeople in Japan
Expatriate volleyball players in Japan
Serbian expatriate sportspeople in Greece
Expatriate volleyball players in Greece
Serbian expatriate sportspeople in Russia
Expatriate volleyball players in Russia
Serbian expatriate sportspeople in Turkey
Expatriate volleyball players in Turkey
Mediterranean Games medalists in volleyball